The following table lists the Van der Waals constants (from the Van der Waals equation) for a number of common gases and volatile liquids.

Units
1 J·m3/mol2 = 1 m6·Pa/mol2 = 10 L2·bar/mol2

1 L2atm/mol2 = 0.101325 J·m3/mol2 = 0.101325 Pa·m6/mol2

1 dm3/mol = 1 L/mol = 1 m3/kmol        (where kmol is kilomoles = 1000 moles)

References

Gas laws
Constants (Data Page)